Divya Khosla Kumar is an Indian actress, producer, and director who works in Hindi films. She has directed various advertisements and has also featured in some music videos. She is married to Bhushan Kumar, the chairman and managing director of T-Series music label and film production company.

Personal life

Khosla married Bhushan Kumar on 13 February 2005 at the Maa Vaishno Devi shrine in Katra. They have a son born in October 2011.

Career

Kumar started modelling at 18 and moved to Mumbai at 20 where she got her Bollywood break and where she also met Bhushan Kumar. She started her career as an actress with the 2004 Telugu film Love Today opposite Uday Kiran. She also appeared in a video of pop song "Aiyyo Rama"  sung by Falguni Pathak. She made her Bollywood debut in the same year with the film Ab Tumhare Hawale Watan Saathiyo portraying Shweta opposite Akshay Kumar and Bobby Deol. Rediff noted, "Divya Khosla doesn't have much to so and acts well in a few sequences."

She then took a long break from acting and focused on directing. After completing a course in cinematography and editing, Divya directed music videos for Agam Kumar Nigam, Jermaine Jackson, Tulsi Kumar, and a few ad films. After directing 20 music videos, Divya did her first directorial venture Yaariyan in 2014. Divya also choreographed 5 songs in the film, including "Baarish", "Maa", "Love Me Thoda Aur", "Allah Wariya" and "Zor Lagake".
Her second directorial project was Sanam Re, which was released on 12 February 2016. Divya has also co-produced many films with T-Series. 

Kumar returned to acting in 2017 with the short film, Bulbul. In 2021, she appeared opposite John Abraham in Satyameva Jayate 2. The film received negative reviews, but Times of India mentioned, "Divya Khosla Kumar is pleasant and has a fairly prominent part to play in this otherwise male-dominated movie."

Kumar will next appear in Yaariyan 2, remake of the 2014 Malayalam film Bangalore Days and a standalone sequel to her film Yaariyan.

Filmography

As an actress

As director

As producer

Music videos

Awards and nominations

References

External links

Indian women film producers
Living people
Actresses from Mumbai
Actresses in Hindi cinema
Hindi-language film directors
Indian women film directors
Indian film actresses
Film directors from Mumbai
21st-century Indian film directors
21st-century Indian women artists
Film producers from Mumbai
Businesswomen from Maharashtra
1987 births